Ergo may refer to:
 A Latin word meaning "therefore" as in Cogito ergo sum
Ergo (journal), an academic journal
 A Greek word έργο meaning "work", used as a prefix ergo-, for example, in ergonomics. 
 Ergometer (rowing), an indoor rowing machine
 Campagnolo ErgoPower, in cycling
 Ergo (Indian newspaper)
 Ergo Proxy, an anime television series
 Ergo, a fictional planet in the Star Wars franchise
 ERGO Group, insurance companies owned by Munich Re
 ERGO Baby, a US babycarrier manufacturer
 Engelbert Ergo, a Flemish Baroque painter